Doon University is a state public university located in Dehradun in the north Indian state of Uttarakhand.

History
The university was founded by order of the Government of Uttarakhand in October 2005. Its first courses started in July 2009.

Campus
 Doon University's campus is around eight kilometers from Dehradun, in the foothills of the Shivalik range and on the banks of the Rispana river. It started as a residential university, but has permitted day students since 2013.  The university covers 52.35 acres and includes separate accommodation for male and female students.

Organisation and administration

Governance
Doon University is a State University under the jurisdiction of the government of Uttarakhand. The Governor of the state is ex-officio Chancellor of the university and appoints the university's Vice Chancellor, its full-time chief executive. The Vice Chancellor chairs a Board of Management, which oversees financial and administrative matters and ratifies recommendations of other councils of the university.

Faculties
Doon University is a non-affiliating university and its academic activities are organized through its eight constituent schools, which run undergraduate, postgraduate and doctoral programs.

Dr.Nitya Nand Himalayan research and study centre 
The school was established in 2019 and offers post graduate courses in Geology,Geography.

School of Media and Communication (SOMC)
The school offers courses in mass communication including journalism, media studies, social and development communication, advertising, public relations, photography, radio, television, films, animation, graphic design, multimedia, media management and communication research. The school has a media production centre consisting of a TV studio and production facility. Its courses include contributions from media industry professionals.

School of Design
This school started in 2015 and allows specialization in graphic design or product design.

School of Environment and Natural Resources
The school offers postgraduate courses in environmental technology and natural resource management.

School of Languages
The school has courses in German, Chinese, Spanish, French, Japanese And English.

School of Management
The school of management offers undergraduate as well as postgraduate courses.

School of Physical Sciences
This school runs undergraduate courses in Physics, Chemistry, Mathematics and Computer Science.

School of Social Sciences
The school was established in 2010, and includes a Department of Economics.

Facilities

Central Library

The university Central Library opened in 2009, offering print and electronic learning materials both of its own and via the INFLIBNET consortium.

Sports

The university has facilities for cricket, football, badminton, basketball and table-tennis.

References

External links
 Official website of Doon University
 SSR to National Assessment and Accreditation Council by Doon University

Universities in Uttarakhand
Universities and colleges in Dehradun
Educational institutions established in 2005
2005 establishments in Uttarakhand